California is a station on the Chicago Transit Authority's 'L' system, serving the Blue Line, From California, trains run every 2–7 minutes during rush-hour periods, and take 12 minutes to reach the Loop.

California, the other two stations on the Milwaukee Elevated, and Forest Park are the only Blue Line stations that are not located in an expressway median, or underground. The Milwaukee Elevated stations are also the only stations on the Blue Line to have side platforms, as all of the subway and freeway stations on the line use island platforms.

History
California station opened on May 25, 1895, as part of the Metropolitan West Side Elevated's Logan Square branch. In the summer of 2008, a temporary entrance immediately to the north of the station house was utilized for two weeks in order to renovate the station house. After stripping the interior, and removing the joist-supported wooden floor, the former crawl space was filled with gravel and covered by a concrete slab, the surface of which was patterned to imitate cobblestone. The repositioned agent box and farecard vending machines substantially increased the pedestrian traffic efficiency through the station house.

The station closed during September and October 2014 for major repairs, but the renovation plans did not include retrofitting the stop so that the elevated platform would be accessible to disabled passengers. The reopening ceremony on October 16 was attended by dignitaries including Rahm Emanuel and Dick Durbin.

Station details

Operations and connections
Streetcars replaced cable cars on Milwaukee Avenue between Lawrence and downtown on August 19, 1906. An extension route from Lawrence to Imlay, near the Forest Preserve, opened on December 11, 1914, and the lines were through-routed on October 1, 1927. Streetcars were typically one car each in Chicago; two-car multiple-unit control trains ran on Milwaukee Avenue between March 2, 1925 and May 5, 1929. As of 1928, the line had owl service between 1:05 and 5:35 a.m., wherein cars to Devon Avenue ran every 15 minutes and cars to Gale Street ran every 30 minutes; during the day, streetcars in Chicago typically had intervals of eight to fifteen minutes. Buses replaced streetcars on weekends on October 28, 1951, and altogether on May 11, 1952.

A streetcar service ran on Fullerton Avenue from Halsted Street to Milwaukee Avenue starting in 1895, being extended west to Pulaski in 1909. A further extension west to Cicero took place on September 9, 1914, and to Long Avenue via shuttle absorption on October 21, 1918, and was finally extended to Central Avenue on October 10, 1928. As of 1928, it had owl service between 1:04 and 4:43 a.m., where cars ran at intervals of eight, 24, and 30 minutes. Trolleybuses replaced streetcars on December 4, 1949.

"Through Route 17" (T.R. 17), a streetcar line using Kedzie and California Avenues, began on February 1, 1911, between 63rd and Kedzie and California and Elston; using Chicago Avenue to connect Kedzie and California. Also in 1911, local cars ran through the route north of 22nd Street. Starting on February 7, 1913, T.R. 17 was extended on Elston and Kedzie to Lawrence Avenue; after December 31, 1915, Milwaukee was used instead of Elston to switch from California to Kedzie. T.R. 17 was extended north to Foster on November 1, 1915, and further to Bryn Mawr on October 5, 1924. As of 1928, T.R. 17 had owl service between 1 and 4:30 a.m., with night cars running every 15 minutes; all cars went between 47th and Kedzie and California and Milwaukee, and alternating between going up to Roscoe and California or Bryn Mawr and Kedzie on the north end, and 47th and Kedzie or 67th and Kedzie at the south end. The Kedzie-Homan bus replaced T.R. 17 streetcars on December 4, 1949, but local streetcars continued on weekends until May 11, 1952, and on weekdays until May 29, 1954.

Bus connections

CTA
 56 Milwaukee 
 94 California

Gallery

References

Works cited

External links 
California (O'Hare Line) Station Page
California Avenue entrance from Google Maps Street View

CTA Blue Line stations
Railway stations in the United States opened in 1895